Sand-e Mir Suiyan (also Romanized as Sand-e Mīr S̄ūīyān; also known as Sand-e Mīrsha‘bān, Sand-e Mīrsūbān, Sand-e Mīrs̄ūbān, Sand Mīr Sha‘bān, and Sand Mīr Sūbān) is a village in Sand-e Mir Suiyan Rural District, Dashtiari District, Chabahar County, Sistan and Baluchestan Province, Iran. At the 2006 census, its population was 1,087, in 207 families.

References 

Populated places in Dashtiari County